Lauren Eve Mayberry (born 7 October 1987) is a Scottish singer, musician and songwriter. She is the vocalist and percussionist of the Scottish pop band Chvrches.
In Chvrches, Mayberry co-writes and co-produces the songs with Iain Cook and Martin Doherty, and sings as the lead vocalist. She also plays drums and keyboards. Mayberry is a soprano.

Early life and education
Mayberry was born in 1987 in Thornhill, Stirling. She has played the piano since she was a child and drums since she was a teenager.

Mayberry attended Beaconhurst School (now known as Fairview International School) an independent school in Bridge of Allan. She also lived in Gladstone, Illinois as a foreign-exchange student. After completing a four-year undergraduate law degree at the University of Strathclyde, she earned a master's degree in journalism in 2010. This led her into a career in freelance journalism and production running. From 2009 to 2010 she was a contributor to the UK music website The Line of Best Fit.

Musical career

From age 15 until 22, she played drums in various bands. Prior to Chvrches, Mayberry was involved in two local bands, Boyfriend/Girlfriend and Blue Sky Archives. In Blue Sky Archives, she was a vocalist and played the drums and keyboards. As a member of Blue Sky Archives, Mayberry also covered the Rage Against the Machine song "Killing in the Name" which was released as a single.

In September 2011, Iain Cook of Aereogramme and The Unwinding Hours produced Blue Sky Archives' Triple A-Side EP. Cook started a new project with his friend Martin Doherty and asked Mayberry to sing on a couple of demos. They wrote together for seven or eight months in a basement studio in Glasgow. Cook, Mayberry and Doherty decided to form a new band after the sessions proved to be successful. The band chose the name Chvrches, using a Roman "v" to distinguish themselves from actual churches on internet searches.

In 2013, the band signed to Glassnote Records after releasing the tracks, "Lies" and "The Mother We Share" in 2012. Their debut EP, Recover, was released in 2013. The band released their debut album, The Bones of What You Believe, on 20 September 2013.

Mayberry has collaborated with artists such as Marshmello, Death Cab For Cutie, Bleachers, The National, the lead singer of Paramore, Hayley Williams, and The Cure's frontman, Robert Smith.

Activism and philanthropy

Feminism and women's rights
Mayberry is a vocal feminist and is the founder of TYCI, a feminist collective in Glasgow. Her ongoing work with the organisation includes written contributions to the online magazine and blog, and she can be heard regularly on TYCI podcasts. The group also holds live events, raising money for charities like Glasgow Women's Aid.

In September 2013, Mayberry wrote an article for The Guardian in response to misogynist messages she received online. She wrote:

She discussed the issue again in a Talks at Google session in 2014 and on Channel 4 News, following aggressive responses to the band's video for "Leave a Trace".

Mayberry is a patron of Rape Crisis Glasgow and has been involved with other organisations such as Water Aid, The Yellow Bird Project, Wild Aid and Plus 1, donating a portion of Chvrches' ticket sales to Amnesty International. She has also been involved with Glasgow's Rock School For Girls and Amy Poehler's Smart Girls.

In 2015, Mayberry wrote about an abusive personal relationship for Jenni Konner and Lena Dunham's Lenny Letter. In December 2016, Mayberry took part in a fundraiser show with Carly Rae Jepsen, Lorde and Charli XCX for the Ally Coalition, an organisation started by Jack Antonoff to raise money for homeless LGBT youth.

United States politics
Mayberry has been an outspoken critic of the Trump administration and has attributed his presidency with the rise of global activism for social issues, calling him "an unpunished sexual predator in office." Referring to the mixed reaction by the crowd to a Trump joke she told at a concert, Mayberry said "you can't say you don't think he's a racist. You can't say you don't think he's a sexist. You can't say you don't think he's transphobic and homophobic, 'cause he has shown us who he is."

Mayberry is a staunch advocate for gun control in the United States. Following the Sutherland Springs church shooting, Mayberry released a video on her Twitter account criticising President Trump's response, arguing that "it’s somewhere on the scale from ironic to disgustingly hypocritical that Donald Trump is talking about mental health with regards to this attack when his administration has done nothing but try to restrict access to help get care for people who need it the most". She further recounted her memory of the Dunblane massacre in which 16 children and one teacher were murdered with handguns, resulting in sweeping gun control legislation in the UK. Mayberry credits these efforts with substantially decreasing the number of mass shootings in the UK.

Personal life
As of 2020, Mayberry lived in Los Angeles.

Mayberry and actor Justin Long have engaged in multiple philanthropic activities together, including hosting a holiday variety show charity fundraiser at The Fonda Theatre in Los Angeles and travelling together to Nicaragua to visit a women's shelter. In May 2018, The Guardian identified Long as Mayberry's boyfriend. Mayberry subsequently suggested that these claims were false.  In September 2018, People reported that Long had split from Mayberry, "whom he began dating in 2016". During an interview with Rolling Stone in October 2018, Mayberry indicated that she was single.

In 2019 Mayberry met her current boyfriend, Samuel Stewart when his band Lo Moon was opening for CHVRCHES. Sam is the son of Dave Stewart.

Discography

With Boyfriend/Girlfriend
Kill Music EP (2007)
Optimism EP (2008)

With Blue Sky Archives
Blue Sky Archives EP (2010)
Plural EP (2011)
"Killing in the Name" (2011)
Triple A-Side EP (2012)

With Chvrches

The Bones of What You Believe (2013)
Every Open Eye (2015)
Love Is Dead (2018)
Screen Violence (2021)

References

External links

TYCI
Goodbye Records - A label by CHVRCHES

Living people
21st-century Scottish women singers
Scottish electronic musicians
Scottish pop singers
Scottish drummers
Scottish keyboardists
Scottish sopranos
Feminist musicians
Scottish journalists
Scottish women journalists
Scottish feminists
British women drummers
Musicians from Glasgow
Scottish singer-songwriters
People from Stirling (council area)
British women in electronic music
21st-century drummers
Scottish expatriates in the United States
1987 births